Rhode Island is a constituent state of the United States.

Rhode Island may also refer to:
Aquidneck Island, officially named Rhode Island, part of the U.S. state and the source of its name
Colony of Rhode Island and Providence Plantations, the former British colony which became the U.S. state
University of Rhode Island
Rhode Island Rams, the athletic program of the above university
Rhodes, the Greek island
Rhode Island (California), an island in San Joaquin River, United States
Road Island (album), by Ambrosia

See also

Rhoda Island